Cheluchi Onyemelukwe is a Nigerian-Canadian author and academic. She is best known for her 2019 family saga novel The Son of the House which she won the Nigeria Prize for Literature awards for in 2021. She is also a Professor of Law at Babcock University, where she served formerly as an assistant professor. In 2019, she won the award for the best international fiction book at the Sharjah International Book Fair. In 2021, she won the SprinNG women authors prize. Her novel was also nominated for the Giller Prize in 2021.

Early life and career
Onyemelukwe is Nigerian. She attended Dalhousie University in Nova Scotia, Canada for her Doctor of Juridical Science, and further more at the University of Nigeria where she obtained her first degree in Law. In 2017, she published Health Research Governance in Africa which was published by Routledge Publishing. In 2019, she published The Son of the House, a family saga which has been translated in several languages and has also received critical acclaim. She is also a Professor of Law in Babcock University.

Bibliography
Health Research Governance in Africa (2017)
The Son of the House (2019)

References

Igbo writers
Igbo educators
Nigerian writers
Dalhousie University alumni
University of Nigeria alumni
21st-century Nigerian lawyers
21st-century Nigerian novelists
21st-century Nigerian women writers
21st-century Canadian lawyers
21st-century Canadian novelists
21st-century Canadian women writers
Nigerian women lawyers
Nigerian women novelists
Canadian women lawyers
Canadian women novelists
Black Canadian writers
Black Canadian women
Living people
Year of birth missing (living people)
Nigeria Prize for Literature winners